is a passenger railway station in located in the town of Kihō, Minamimuro District, Mie, Japan, operated by Central Japan Railway Company (JR Tōkai).

Lines

Station layout
The station consists of a single island platform connected to the station building by a level crossing. The station is unattended. 

The station was also connected by a three-kilometer private line which runs from the freight yard next to the station to the Hokuetsu Kishu Paper Co. factory nearby. The line was abolished in 2016 when the freight services were discontinued.

Platforms

History
Udono Station opened as a station on the Kisei West Line on 8 August 1940. The passenger station was absorbed into the JR Central network upon the privatization of JNR on 1 April 1987, with the sidings and freight depot portion of the station falling under the aegis of the Japan Freight Railway Company. The freight depot was abolished in 2016.

Passenger statistics
In fiscal 2019, the station was used by an average of 111 passengers daily (boarding passengers only).

Surrounding area
Kiho Town Hall (former Udono Village Hall)
Kiho Town Udono Elementary School
Hokuetsu Paper Mills Kishu Factory
Udono Port

See also
List of railway stations in Japan

References

External links

 JR Central timetable 

Railway stations in Japan opened in 1940
Kihō
Railway stations in Mie Prefecture